In Germany, several laws govern drugs (both recreational and pharmaceutical).

 Betäubungsmittelgesetz (BtMG), regulates narcotics and contains explicit lists of those covered: Anlage I (authorized scientific use only), Anlage II (authorized trade only, not prescriptible) and Anlage III (special prescription form required). The lists contain some exceptions for lower doses.
 Betäubungsmittel-Verschreibungsverordnung (BTMVV), regulates the prescription of Anlage III narcotics on the special prescription form
 Arzneimittelgesetz (AMG), covers prescription drugs, pharmacy-only and general sales list drugs.
 Verordnung über die Verschreibungspflicht von Arzneimitteln, also known as Arzneimittelverschreibungsverordnung (AMVV), executive order that explicitly lists prescription drugs. It contains a blanket inclusion for all exceptions from Anlage I, II and III BtMG; thus, a normal prescription is still required for such preparations.
 Verordnung über apothekenpflichtige und freiverkäufliche Arzneimittel, also known as Arzneimittelverkehrs-Rechtsverordnung (AMVerkRV), executive order that explicitly lists pharmacy-only and general sales list drugs.
 Medizinproduktegesetz (MPG)
Medizinprodukte-Abgabeverordnung (MPAV), covers some substances with medical effects that are not drugs, like disinfectants for medical apparatuses

 Neue-psychoaktive-Stoffe-Gesetz (NpSG)
Governing chemical groups of research chemicals, allowing to cover multiple variants. Use of covered substances is permitted only for industrial and scientific purposes.

 Grundstoffüberwachungsgesetz (GÜG)
Covers raw materials that can be used for synthesizing drugs. These are categorized into Kategorie 1 (authorization required), Kategorie 2 (reporting required) and Kategorie 3 (export restrictions)

See also
 2022 German cannabis legalization framework
 :de:Arzneimittelgesetz (Deutschland) (AMG)
 :de:Medizinproduktegesetz (MPG), includes Medizinprodukte-Abgabeverordnung (MPAV)
 :de:Neue-psychoaktive-Stoffe-Gesetz (NpSG)
 :de:Grundstoffüberwachungsgesetz (GÜG)
 :de:Arzneimittelverschreibungsverordnung (AMVV)
 :de:Betäubungsmittel-Verschreibungsverordnung (BtMVV)

Drug policy of Germany
Drug control law
Law-related lists